The 1st European Badminton Championships were held in Bochum (Germany), between 19  and 21 April 1968, and hosted by the European Badminton Union and the Deutscher Badminton-Verband e.V.

Medalists

Results

Men's singles

Women's singles

Men's doubles

Women's doubles

Mixed doubles

Medal account

References

European Badminton Championships
Badminton
European Badminton Championships
B
Badminton tournaments in Germany
1960s in North Rhine-Westphalia
European Badminton Championships
Sport in Bochum
Sports competitions in North Rhine-Westphalia